Osyutino is a rural locality (a village) in Ugolskoye Rural Settlement, Sheksninsky District, Vologda Oblast, Russia. Osyutino is located 15 km southeast of Sheksna (the district's administrative centre) by road. Malgino is the nearest rural locality.

References 

Rural localities in Sheksninsky District